Camp Cherokee may be:
Cherokee Council Explorer Base
Cherokee Scout Reservation
Camp Cherokee (Connecticut)
Camp Cherokee (North Carolina)
Camp Cherokee (Oklahoma)
Camp Cherokee (Tennessee)
Camp Cherokee (Texas)